The women's 4 × 400 metres relay event at the 2021 European Athletics Indoor Championships was held on 7 March 2021 at 19:10 (final) local time.

Medalists

Records

Final

References

External links

2021 European Athletics Indoor Championships
4 × 400 metres relay at the European Athletics Indoor Championships
European